Mathias Patin (born April 25, 1974 in Colombes, Hauts-de-Seine) is a French volleyball player, who won the bronze medal with the France men's national volleyball team at the 2002 World Championships. He is 1.85 meters tall and plays as a passer.  He is now teaching in Paris 1 Panthéon-Sorbonne University in Paris, France.

Clubs

Awards 
Championnat de France : 2003 (Championship of France Pro A of male volley ball)

External links 
http://www.asnieres-volley92.com/mathias_patin.htm

1974 births
Living people
Sportspeople from Colombes
Olympic volleyball players of France
Volleyball players at the 2004 Summer Olympics
French men's volleyball players